The Office of Technology Policy (OTP) is an office within the National Institute of Standards and Technology. Formerly it was an office of the now defunct Technology Administration of the United States Department of Commerce. The office works with industry to promote competitiveness and advocates integrated policies for maximizing the impact of technology on economic growth.

OTP is the only office in the United States federal government with the explicit mission of developing and advocating national policies and initiatives that use technology to build America's economic strength.  OTP's stated goals include the creation of high-wage jobs and improvements in the United States' quality of life.

External links

United States Department of Commerce